Denis Colin is a French bass clarinettist and composer, born in Vanves, 24 July 1956.

After studying clarinet at the conservatoire in Versailles, he turned to jazz, making appearances with Steve Lacy, François Cotinaud and Alan Silva.

He was in charge of the IACP (Institute for Artistic and Cultural Perception) from 1979 to 1982 and taught jazz at the Montreuil sous bois conservatoire.

Among the musicians he has played with are: Celestrial Communication Orchestra, Texture (with saxophonist François Cotinaud), Bekummernis (led by Luc Le Masne), François Tusques and Archie Shepp.

He has written music for the theatre (for the Cie Tuchenn) and cinema (for Florence Miailhe). In 1991, he formed a trio with Didier Petit (cello) and Pablo Cueco (zarb) to explore world music and free jazz. The trio expanded in 1995, adding Bruno Girard or Régis Huby (violin) and Camel Zekri (guitar) to form the group Les Arpenteurs.

In 2000, Denis Colin was commissioned by Radio France to create "Dans les cordes", a piece for ten musicians. In 2001, the trio reconstituted itself again around Afro-American music, with musicians from the Minneapolis scene, for the album Something in Common.  This adventure continued in 2005 with singer Gwen Matthews, who was featured on a second American album.

Colin emerged again in 2008 with a younger, rotating ensemble, La Société des Arpenteurs.

The Chicago Reader has described him as a 'major artist'.

Discography

 Portrait for a Small Woman, Celestrial Communication Orchestra, with Alan Silva 1978, Desert Mirage, 1982
 Texture sextet 1981, Polygames, with Itaru Oki, François Cotinaud, Bruno Girard, Pierre Jacquet, Michel Coffi 1983
 Clarinette basse Seul, 1990
 Trois, 1992
 In situ à Banlieues Bleues, 1994
 Fluide, 1997
 European Echoes with Barre Phillips, Bobo Stenson, Kent Carter, Theo Jörgensmann,   Wolter Wierbos, Benoit Delbecq etc., 1999
 Étude de terrain, 1999
 Something in Common, 2001
 Song for Swans, 2005
 Subject to Change, 2009
 Subject to Live, 2011

References

External links
 Website
 Interview in English
 Interview in French
 Chicago Reader writeup
 Album review
 Album review
 Album review

1956 births
Living people
French jazz clarinetists
21st-century clarinetists
Klarinettenquartett Cl-4 members